

Pentium II Xeon

"Drake" (250 nm) 
 All models support: MMX
 All models support quad-processor configurations

Pentium III Xeon

"Tanner" (250 nm) 
 Based on P6 microarchitecture
 All models support: MMX, SSE
 All models support quad-processor configurations
 Die size: 123 mm²
 Steppings: B0, C0

"Cascades" (180 nm) 
 All models support: MMX, SSE
 Only Xeon 700 and 900 are capable of quad processor configurations
 ALL models shipped in either 2.8v, 5v, or 12v voltage variants

Notes

References 

 
 
 
 
 

Intel Xeon (P6)